The Clinton River (in French: rivière Clinton) is a tributary of the Arnold River whose current flows northward and successively empties onto the south shore of the Lac des Joncs outlet, the south shore of lake Mégantic, the Chaudière River and the south shore of St. Lawrence River.

The Clinton River flows through the municipalities of Notre-Dame-des-Bois, Quebec, Saint-Augustin-de-Woburn and Piopolis, in the Le Granit Regional County Municipality, in the administrative region of Estrie, in Quebec, in Canada.

Geography 

  eastward in the township of Chesham, in the municipality of Notre-Dame-des-Bois, to the limit of the township of Woburn which belongs to Saint-Augustin-de-Woburn;
  northeasterly, to the confluence of the "Mocassin brook" just before the route 212 bridge;
  northeasterly, to the confluence of a stream, which originates near Mount Scotch, and which comes from the southwest;
  to the limit of the Township of Clinton;
  northeasterly, to the confluence of a stream coming from the west;
  towards the northeast, up to the limit of the municipality of Piopolis;
  eastward, curving northward, in Piopolis;
  towards the south-east, up to the confluence of a stream (coming from the south);
  north-east, crossing the "Chemin de la rivière Bergeron", up to its confluence.

Toponymy 
The toponym rivière Clinton was made official on December 5, 1968, at the Commission de toponymie du Québec.

See also 

 List of rivers of Quebec

References 

Rivers of Estrie
Le Granit Regional County Municipality